Claude Gravereaux (2 May 1913 – 21 November 1943) was a French field hockey player who competed in the 1936 Summer Olympics.

He was a member of the French field hockey team, which finish fourth in the 1936 Olympic tournament. He played three matches as halfback.

Personal life
At the outbreak of the Second World War in 1939, Gravereaux volunteered for the French Army. While serving as a corporal in a machine-gun squad, he was wounded in the jaw and captured at Namur during the Battle of France in 1940, but escaped and enlisted in the Free French Army. For actions during the invasion of France, Gravereaux received the Croix de guerre and Médaille militaire. While serving with the Free French forces, he took part in Operation Torch; however, he suffered a relapse of his wound and travelled to New York City, where he died in November 1943.

References

External links
 
Claude Gravereaux's profile at Sports Reference.com

1913 births
1943 deaths
French male field hockey players
Olympic field hockey players of France
Field hockey players at the 1936 Summer Olympics
French Army personnel of World War II
Free French military personnel of World War II
French Army soldiers
French military personnel killed in World War II
French prisoners of war in World War II
World War II prisoners of war held by Germany
Escapees from German detention
Recipients of the Croix de Guerre 1939–1945 (France)
Recipients of the Médaille militaire (France)
French escapees